The 2012 Men's Water Polo Olympic Qualification Tournament was held at the Kinsman Sports Centre in Edmonton, Alberta, Canada, from 1 to 8 April 2012.

Participants

There were 12 places originally allocated to continental associations in the tournament not already directly qualified to the Olympics – 5 from Europe, 3 from the Americas, 2 from Asia, 1 from Africa, and 1 from Oceania.

Montenegro, Germany, Greece, Spain and Romania qualified from the 2012 European Water Polo Championships and confirmed their attendance at the tournament. Canada qualified from the Americas as host country. Brazil and Cuba qualified from the 2011 Pan American Games, Brazil confirmed their attendance, but Cuba declined and was replaced by Argentina, the next ranked team in the 2011 Pan American Games.

No teams from Asia, Africa and Oceania applied to participate in the qualification tournament. There was an article written by a FINA press correspondent in Japan showing confusion around the qualification procedure from the 2012 Asian Water Polo Championship, as the article states that the winners of the Asian Championship had advanced to this qualification tournament (in fact, they qualified directly for the Olympics) and that Japan could no longer get to the Olympics (in fact, according to FINA By-Laws, they were eligible for this tournament, and they did not apply). The next highest placed teams from the other continents were invited to take these four available places, in the following rotation:
 Host continent (Americas)
 Americas
 Asia
 Europe
 Oceania
 Africa

In the first rotation, the next-placed teams in the 2011 Pan American Games, Mexico and Colombia, declined to participate, but Venezuela, the last-placed team, did decide to sign-up for the tournament using the host continent place. As there were no remaining American, Asian, Oceanian, nor African teams making themselves available for selection, the next three places went to the three participants in the 2012 European Water Polo Championships that were not already either qualified for the Olympics or already in this tournament - the Netherlands, Macedonia and Turkey.

Draw

The draw took place on 19 February 2012 at 12:00 at the Crowne Plaza, London Docklands. There are six teams in each preliminary round group. Each team was drawn from a draw line of two teams based on their results, first in the last World Championships, then by their last continental championships.

Venezuela withdrew.

After being drawn into Group A and B, the teams drew numbers from 1 to 6 to determine the order of matches.

Preliminary round
All times are local (UTC−6)

Group A

Group B

Knockout stage 
All times are local (UTC−6)

Bracket

5th-8th place bracket

Quarterfinal round
The winners in the quarterfinal round qualify for the 2012 Olympic Games water polo tournament.

Semifinal round

5th-8th classification semifinals

1st-4th classification semifinals

Final round

7th place match

5th place match

Bronze medal match

Final

Final ranking

See also
2012 Women's Water Polo Olympic Games Qualification Tournament

References

External links
 Official site

Qualification Tournament, men
2012